The Black Prince is a 2017 international historical drama film directed by Kavi Raz and featuring the acting debut of Satinder Sartaaj. It tells the story of Duleep Singh, the last Maharajah of the Sikh Empire and the Punjab area, and his relationship with Queen Victoria.

The story revolves around the young prince as he attempts both to regain his throne and reconcile himself with the two cultures of his Indian birth and British education.

Plot
After the death of his father,  Maharajah Ranjit Singh, the previous ruler of the Sikh empire, Maharaja Duleep Singh is placed on the throne at the age of five. In 1849, when Punjab is annexed to British India, the young prince is removed from the throne and separated from his mother. He is put under the guardianship of British surgeon Dr. John Login. At the age of 15, Duleep Singh is sent to England where he meets Queen Victoria. A relationship between the two develops.

Duleep Singh is eventually able to reestablish contact with his mother and as a result begins to reconnect with the culture of his birth. Duleep attempts to return to India to reclaim his kingdom, but is continually thwarted by British colonial politics.

Cast

 Satinder Sartaaj as Duleep Singh 
 Amanda Root as Queen Victoria
 Jason Flemyng as Dr Login
 Ameet Chana as Aziz-Ud-din
 Joe Egan as Ishris Reval
 David Essex as Colonel Hurban
 Madhurima Tuli as Young Maharani Jinda
 Shabana Azmi as Maharani Jinda
 Keith Duffy as Casey
 Kumud Pant as Arur Singh's Protect Soldier
 Atul Sharma as Hotel Manager 
 Leanne Joyce as Ada Wetherill
 James Weber Brown as General Charles Carroll Tevis
 Arinder Sadhra as Mangla
 Lyndon Ogbourne Sir O Butan
 Sandeep Bhojak as Duleep Singh's Protect Soldier
 Sophie Stevens as Bamba Muller
 Ranjit Singh Shubh as Thakur Singh
 Malcolm Freeman as Brigadier General Hogg
 Jobanpreet Singh as Herra Singh
 Emma Kenny as Lady Login
 Tony Hasnath as Victor Duleep Singh
 Adeera Brar as Sophia Duleep Singh
 Ana Correia as the prince's bride Catherine Duleep Singh
 Courtney Sinclair as a Victorian lady

Production

Development
Written and directed by Los Angeles-based Indian filmmaker Kavi Raz, The Black Prince stars the singer Satinder Sartaaj in his acting debut.

On the relationship between Duleep and the Queen, producer Jasjeet Singh noted: "What’s striking is that the British government treated him terribly, but throughout his life, there was a relationship of great fondness between him and Queen Victoria."

The Black Prince was produced by Brillstein Entertainment Partners; it is a bilingual English-Hindi production. The movie is set in India and the UK.

Music
George Kallis composed the music for The Black Prince.

The lead actor, Sartaaj, also wrote and performed some of the songs appearing in the film

Release
The Black Prince premiered at the Manchester Film Festival on 3 March 2017 and was released worldwide on 21 July 2017. It was also released in two dubbed versions: Punjabi and Hindi.

Reception

Critical response
The Black Prince has received generally unfavorable reviews, with most critics decrying the slow pacing as letting down the genuinely interesting subject matter, the Hindustan Times critic said: "The script is sluggish and painfully slow paced."

Of the actors, Shabana Azmi, playing the prince's mother Rani Jindan, was singled out as one of the better performers.

As of March 2018, 8% of the 13 reviews compiled by Rotten Tomatoes are positive and have an average score of 4.1 out of 10.

Box office
According to Box Office Mojo, The Black Prince has grossed $633,000 in three territories. The film grossed $194,000 in its opening weekend, with $106,000 earned in the United Kingdom, $8,000 in New Zealand and $80,000 in Australia.

See also
Maharaja Duleep Singh

References

External links

Punjabi-language Indian films
2017 biographical drama films
2010s historical films
2017 films
Biographical films about royalty
Cultural depictions of Queen Victoria on film
Indian historical romance films
Films scored by George Kallis
Films set in the Sikh Empire
Films about Sikhism
Ranjit Singh
Films set in the British Raj
Films set in London
Films about royalty
2017 drama films